The arrondissement of Saint-Pierre is an arrondissement in the French overseas region of Martinique. It has eight communes.

Composition

The communes of the arrondissement of Saint-Pierre, and their INSEE codes, are:

 Bellefontaine (97234)
 Le Carbet (97204)
 Case-Pilote (97205)
 Fonds-Saint-Denis (97208)
 Le Morne-Rouge (97218)
 Le Morne-Vert (97233)
 Le Prêcheur (97219)
 Saint-Pierre (97225)

History

The arrondissement of Saint-Pierre, containing eight communes that were previously part of the arrondissement of Fort-de-France, was created in 1995.

Before 2015, the arrondissements of Martinique were subdivided into cantons. The cantons of the arrondissement of Saint-Pierre were, as of January 2015:

 Le Carbet
 Case-Pilote-Bellefontaine
 Le Morne-Rouge
 Le Prêcheur
 Saint-Pierre

References

Saint-Pierre